The following article outlines statistics for 2016 World Cup of Hockey, which took place in Toronto from 17 September to 1 October 2016. Goals scored during penalty shoot-outs are not counted.

Individual leaders

Scoring leaders
List depicts skaters sorted by points, then goals.

Source: WCH2016

Statistics for goaltenders
List depicts goaltenders with at least more than 60 minutes of time on ice sorted by wins.

Source: WCH2016

Team statistics

Canada 

Source: WCH2016

Czech Republic 

Source: WCH2016

Team Europe

Source: WCH2016

Finland 

Source: WCH2016

Team North America

Source: WCH2016

Russia 

Source: WCH2016

Sweden 

Source: WCH2016

United States 

Source: WCH2016

References

Statistics
Ice hockey statistics